Gavin Mark Nebbeling (born 15 May 1963) is a South African former professional footballer who was active exclusively in England between 1981 and 1998. Nebbeling, who played as a central defender, made over 250 appearances in the Football League and over 300 senior professional appearances throughout his entire career.

Career
Born in Johannesburg, Nebbeling played youth football in his native South Africa with Arcadia Shepherds before beginning his professional career in August 1981 with English League side Crystal Palace. While at Palace Nebbeling spent a loan spell with Northampton Town, before signing permanently with Fulham in 1989. While at Fulham, Nebbeling was their only foreign player. Nebbeling spent another loan spell at Hereford United, before signing permanently with Preston North End in 1993. Nebbeling made a total of 275 appearances in the Football League, scoring 14 goals. He later played non-league football with Kingstonian, scoring four goals in 62 appearances.

After football
After retiring as a player, Nebbeling became a photocopier salesman.

References

1963 births
Living people
South African soccer players
Crystal Palace F.C. players
Northampton Town F.C. players
Fulham F.C. players
Hereford United F.C. players
Preston North End F.C. players
Kingstonian F.C. players
English Football League players
White South African people
Association football central defenders